Donggang may refer to:

Mainland China
Donggang District (东港区), in Rizhao, Shandong
Donggang, Liaoning (东港市), county-level city in Dandong, Liaoning
Towns
Written as "东港镇":
Donggang, Huilai County, in Huilai County, Guangdong
Donggang, Qinhuangdao, in Haigang District, Qinhuangdao, Hebei
Donggang, Wuxi, in Xishan District, Wuxi, Jiangsu

Written as "东岗镇":
Donggang, Linzhou, Henan, in Linzhou City, Henan
Donggang, Fusong County, in Fusong County, Jilin

Subdistricts 

 Donggang Subdistrict in Chengguan District, Lanzhou, Gansu

Taiwan
Donggang, Pingtung (東港鎮), town in west-central Pingtung County, Taiwan
Donggang River (Taiwan) (東港溪), river flowing through Pingtung County

South Korea
Donggang (South Korea), a river flowing through the Gangwon-do district, a tributary of the South Hangang River

See also
 Donggong (disambiguation)